General elections were held in Southern Rhodesia on 6 September 1933, the third elections since the colony of Southern Rhodesia was granted self-government. It is notable as one of only two general elections in Southern Rhodesia which led to a defeat for the sitting government, as the Reform Party won a narrow majority of two seats in the Legislative Assembly. Their victory was to be short-lived.

Electoral system
No changes were made in the franchise or the procedure of elections since the previous election, the Electoral Act, 1928 being unamended.

Electoral districts
Shortly before the election, a last-minute decision was made to revise the boundaries of electoral districts which were exceptionally large or exceptionally small. The Shamva district, to the north-east of Salisbury, was found to be too small and was abolished and merged with most of the Mazoe district; the remaining parts of both were added to Lomagundi district. In Salisbury itself, the two-member Salisbury South district was reduced to one member, and a new two-member Salisbury Central created, with knock-on effects to Salisbury North.

Outside of these changes the boundaries were the same as used in 1928.

Political parties
The Progressive Party, which had won four seats to become the official opposition in 1928, merged with the County Party and reorganised itself as the Reform Party in October 1929.

Results

By constituency
 Ind – Independent
 Lab – Rhodesia Labour Party
 Ref – Reform Party
 RP – Rhodesia Party

Changes during the assembly
There were no byelections during this Assembly. In August 1934, most of the Reform Party merged with the Rhodesia Party to form the United Party.

References
 Source Book of Parliamentary Elections and Referenda in Southern Rhodesia 1898–1962 ed. by F.M.G. Willson (Department of Government, University College of Rhodesia and Nyasaland, Salisbury 1963)
 Holders of Administrative and Ministerial Office 1894–1964 by F.M.G. Willson and G.C. Passmore, assisted by Margaret T. Mitchell (Source Book No. 3, Department of Government, University College of Rhodesia and Nyasaland, Salisbury 1966)

Elections in Southern Rhodesia
Southern Rhodesia
1933 in Southern Rhodesia
Southern Rhodesia
Election and referendum articles with incomplete results